The year 1662 in music involved some significant events.

Events
July 24 – Jean-Baptiste Lully marries Madeleine, daughter of French composer Michel Lambert.

Publications
Richard Dering –  for two and three voices with basso continuo (London: John Playford), published posthumously
Jakob Ludwig – Partiturbuch Ludwig (with works by Bertali, Frohberger, etc.)
Courtly Masquing Ayres (Works by Jenkins, Adson, etc.)

Classical music
Thomas Barcroft (or George Barcroft) – Service in G
Philip Friederick Buchner – Plectrum musicum, Op.4
Maurizio Cazzati – Correnti, e balletti, Op.30
Andreas Hammerschmidt – Kirchen- und Tafel-Music
Giovanni Legrenzi – Compiete con le lettanie & antifone, Op.7
Johann Heinrich Schmelzer – Sacro-profanus concentus musicus (13 chamber sonatas)

Opera
Giovanni Andrea Bontempi – Il Paride
Francesco Cavalli – Ercole amante (premiered Feb. 7 in Paris)

Births
February 5 – Giuseppe Vignola, Italian composer and musician (died 1712)
August 28 – Angiola Teresa Moratori Scanabecchi, composer and painter (died 1708)
August 28 – Maria Aurora von Königsmarck, noblewoman and composer (died 1728)
December 17 – Samuel Wesley I, lyricist (died 1735)
date unknown
Jean-Baptiste Drouart de Bousset, composer (died 1725)
Jean-Nicolas de Francine, director of the Opéra national de Paris (died 1735)
probable – Giovanni Lorenzo Lulier, composer, cellist and trombone player (died 1700)

Deaths 
January 26 – Marco Marazzoli, Italian composer of cantatas (born c.1602 or 1608)
February – Giuseppe Zamponi, organist and composer (born c.1615)
February 23 – Johann Crüger, composer (born 1598)
April 23 – William Young, composer
April 27 – Davis Mell, English violinist (born 1604)
May 7 (or April 7)– Lucrezia Orsina Vizzana, singer, organist, and composer (born 1590)
May 18 – Adam Billaut, French carpenter, poet and singer (born 1602)
July 1 – Simon Ives, English organist and court composer (born 1600)
July 7 – Andreas Düben, organist and composer (born c. 1597)
September 7 – Marco Scacchi, composer and music writer (born c.1600)
October 21 – Henry Lawes, composer (born 1595)
date unknown 
Galeazzo Sabbatini, composer and music theorist (born 1597)